The New England Holocaust Memorial in Boston, Massachusetts, is dedicated to the Jewish people who were murdered by Nazi Germany during the Holocaust.

Description

Founded by Stephan Ross, a Holocaust survivor, and erected in 1995, the memorial consists of six glass towers under which visitors may walk. Engraved on the outside walls of each tower are groups of numbers representing the six million Jews murdered in the Holocaust. Inscribed on the inner walls are quotes from survivors of each camp. Underneath the towers, steam rises up through metal grates from a dark floor with twinkling lights on it.Each tower symbolizes a different major extermination camp (Majdanek, Chełmno, Sobibor, Treblinka, Bełżec, and Auschwitz-Birkenau), as well as menorah candles, the six million Jews murdered in the Holocaust (one million per tower), and the six years that the mass extermination took place, 1939-1945. Each tower consists of twenty-four individual panels of glass. Twenty-two of the panels are inscribed with seven digit numbers and two of the panels are inscribed with messages. In total, there are 132 panels from the six towers inscribed with numbers; however, each panel is identical. A single panel contains 17,280 unique numbers which are subsequently repeated throughout the memorial. Numbers are arranged in eight by ten blocks, with each block consisting of sets of six numbers arranged in a six by six grid. In total there are 2,280,960 non-unique numbers listed on the 132 panels. A digital tour, which explains some holocaust history and meaning behind the monument, is available through QR codes as of July 2021.

The New England Holocaust Memorial is located a few steps off the Freedom Trail, making it a popular tourist attraction.

The site is maintained by the Boston National Historic Park and is located in Carmen Park, along Congress and Union Streets, near Faneuil Hall. Carmen Park was named in recognition of William Carmen's service to the community and his vision and leadership in creating the New England Holocaust Memorial.

Messages

On some of the panels of the glass towers are messages, for instance the Sobibor tower includes the following:

Threats and vandalism

The Boston memorial as well as the United States Holocaust Memorial Museum in Washington, D.C., was targeted for destruction in a 2002 white supremacist terror plot by a neo-Nazi and his white supremacist girlfriend. In the 2002 federal trial, the jury convicted both defendants on all counts.

In the early morning hours of June 28, 2017, one of the  glass panels on the memorial was smashed with a rock. The 21-year-old suspect was charged with malicious destruction of property and destruction of a place of memorial. The suspect was denied bail due to violations of probation. The lawyer for the suspect said he suffers from mental health issues.

On August 14, 2017, the memorial was damaged for the second time in two months by a 17-year-old who threw a rock at one of the glass panels. The suspect was quickly accosted and restrained by a Drug Enforcement Administration Special Agent and Boston firefighter, both of whom were off duty, until Boston police could take the suspect into custody. Initial charges of willful destruction of property were quickly filed, and the incident is under investigation as a possible hate crime.

On March 22, 2021, members of the Nationalist Social Club photographed themselves in front of the memorial and posted it to social media. This was viewed by many American Jews as a provocation.

References

External links

1995 sculptures
21st-century attacks on synagogues and Jewish communal organizations in the United States
Cultural history of Boston
Glass works of art
Government Center, Boston
Holocaust memorials
Holocaust museums in the United States
Jews and Judaism in Boston
Monuments and memorials in Boston
Outdoor sculptures in Boston
Vandalized works of art in Massachusetts